= Helen T. Gray =

American journalist

- Born: Helen T. Gott; July 2, 1942; Jersey City, New Jersey, U.S.
- Died: November 11, 2023 (aged 81)
- Education: Syracuse University
- Occupations: Journalist; editor
- Writing career
- Period: 1965–2013
- Genre: Journalism
- Subjects: Religion, Civil Rights Movement, ethics
- Notable awards: KCABJ Lifetime Achievement Award (1997); KCABJ Features Award (2012)

Helen T. Gray (July 2, 1942 – November 11, 2023) was an American reporter for The Kansas City Star, serving as their faith and religion editor for over four decades. She was their second Black reporter and first female reporter.

== Early life ==
Gray was born in Jersey City, New Jersey, to William and Cynthia Gott. She attended Syracuse University, graduating with degrees in journalism and political science.

== Career ==
Gray was hired on to be a reporter for the Kansas City Star in 1965. She was the second black reporter and the first black female repoter at the Kansas City Star. In her early career, Gray wrote about the civil rights movement, having interviewed Martin Luther King Jr. and wrote about his subsequent assassination. She covered topics such as racial discrimination and quality of life for Black Kansas Citians. Her accolades include a 1997 Lifetime Achievement Award and a 2012 Features Award (for her article "Songs of Freedom"), both from the Kansas City Association of Black Journalists, an affiliate chapter of the National Association of Black Journalists.

In 1971, she was appointed the religion editor and kept the position until she retired from the paper in 2013. While in this position she gained recognition from the Religion News Association. Gray published articles on topics such as the emptiness of American materialism, the ethics of euthanasia, and the Israel-Palestine conflict.
